Dictyonema lawreyi is a species of basidiolichen in the family Hygrophoraceae. Found in the United States, it was formally described as a new species in 2019 by Manuela Dal Forno, Laurel Kaminsky, and Robert Lücking. The type specimen was collected in Ocala National Forest (Marion County, Florida), where it was growing as an epiphyte on a trunk of Magnolia. It is only known to occur here and in two other locations in Florida, all in hardwood forests. The type was collected by lichenologist James D. Lawrey, for whom the species is named, and whose work, according to the authors, "helped to redefine the circumscription of the genus Dictyonema s.str."

References

lawreyi
Lichen species
Lichens described in 2019
Lichens of the Southeastern United States
Taxa named by Robert Lücking
Basidiolichens
Fungi without expected TNC conservation status